Palla was a Galician-Portuguese troubadour or minstrel from Santiago de Compostela, active at the court of Alfonso VII of León in the mid-twelfth century.

Palla is described in contemporary documentation as a iuglar (cognate with "juggler", but signifying jongleur). He was at Alfonso's court at Burgos on 24 April 1136 and again at Toledo on 9 December 1151.

Sources
Barton, Simon. The Aristocracy in Twelfth-Century León and Castile. Cambridge: Cambridge University Press, 1997. .

12th-century Galician-Portuguese troubadours
People from Santiago de Compostela
Year of birth unknown
Year of death unknown